Schierup is a surname. Notable people with the surname include:

Carl-Ulrik Schierup (born 1948), Swedish academic
Thorbjørn Schierup (born 1990), Danish sailor